Camponotus hyatti is a species of carpenter ant.  The species is native to the northern Pacific coast, from Oregon to the Baja California Peninsula.  The species is characterized by its five-toothed mandibles and the smooth, shiny appearance of its clypeus, as well as a pronounced metanotal groove, lending the basal surface of the propodeum a distinct convex appearance.  It commonly nests in sagebrush, Yucca, manzanita, and oak.

References

External links
 Camponotus hyatti at AntWiki

hyatti
Fauna of California
Insects of Mexico
Fauna of the Baja California Peninsula
Insects described in 1893